The Seafood Market attack was a Palestinian shooting and grenade Terrorist attack on the Seafood Market restaurant in Tel Aviv, Israel, on 5 March 2002. Palestinian terrorist Ibrahim Hasouna murdered three Israelis, including a Druze police officer, and wounded 35.

The Al-Aqsa Martyrs' Brigade claimed responsibility for the attack.

An Israeli court found Marwan Barghouti, head of Tanzim, guilty of directing this attack, and of directing other killings including the Murder of Georgios Tsibouktzakis .

Background
The attack was carried out by Tanzim, and involved three operatives: Drivers Mazen Mahmoud Omar Khadi and Marad Nazmi Agloni, and shooter Ibrahim Hasouna. Under police interrogation, the drivers confessed that they had initially infiltrated Jerusalem, planning to carry out an attack in Pisgat Ze'ev, but were deterred by a heavy police presence. They then drove to Tel Aviv. Hasouna asked to be dropped off in a densely populated area, and the drivers decided to drop him off on a pedestrian bridge overlooking a number of restaurants in central Tel Aviv.

The attack occurred in the early morning, at which time the Seafood market restaurant was crowded with people gathered for an Oriental music evening and a bachelorette party.

The attack
At 2:10 AM, Hasouna opened fire. Shooting at diners sitting near the windows with an M16 rifle, he emptied two magazines. According to eyewitness Gilli Cohen, "people started to push their way to the bathrooms, and there was mass hysteria". He also threw two fragmentation grenades at people escaping the restaurant, though they did not detonate. Hasouna then headed for the "Mifgash Hasteakim" restaurant next door, pulling out a knife and stabbing at police officers and civilians attempting to restrain him, killing a police officer, but was eventually shot dead.

Victims 
 Salim Barakat, 33, of Yarka
 Yosef Haybi, 52, of Herzliya
 Eli Dahan, 53, of Lod

Aftermath
In the immediate aftermath of the attack, police set up roadblocks, at one of which Khadi and Agloni were caught while attempting to flee to Ramallah via Jerusalem. 

In response to this attack, as well as to a shooting in Jerusalem that killed an Israeli woman and terrorism over the previous weekend which killed 22 Israelis, the Israel Defense Forces (IDF) immediately launched a series of raids in the West Bank and Gaza Strip in which at least 17 Palestinians were killed. According to Israeli media, the attacks were set to continue for several days, focusing on the Tanzim militia.

When Tanzim head Marwan Barghouti was arrested and brought to trial in Israel, the attack was among the offenses listed in the indictment. Barghouti is currently serving five life sentences in an Israeli prison.

References

External links
 israelinsider: security: 5 Israelis killed in attacks on Tel Aviv
 Israeli Raids Kill 17 Palestinians; In Tel Aviv, 3 Die in a Shooting - New York Times
 Two Palestinians arrested for assisting Seafood Market terrorist - Haaretz Daily Newspaper | Israel News
 Tanzim boss Marwan Barghouti indicted for murder, branded 'arch terrorist' - Haaretz Daily Newspaper | Israel News

Spree shootings in Israel
Terrorist incidents in Tel Aviv
Terrorist attacks attributed to Palestinian militant groups
Terrorist incidents in Israel in 2002
2000s crimes in Tel Aviv
Attacks on restaurants in Asia
March 2002 events in Asia
Attacks on buildings and structures in Israel
2002 murders in Israel
Building bombings in Israel